The 1971 Westminster Council election took place on 13 May 1971 to elect members of Westminster City Council in London, England. The whole council was up for election and the Conservative party stayed in overall control of the council.

Background

Election result

Ward results

References

Election, 1971
1971 London Borough council elections
May 1971 events in the United Kingdom